Lucas Nicchiarelli (born 24 August 1996) is an Argentine professional footballer who plays as a forward.

Career
Nicchiarelli had a period in the youth system of San Lorenzo, before joining All Boys in 2016. A year later, he made a scoring impact on his professional bow after netting the final goal of a 4–0 victory over Estudiantes in Primera B Nacional on 12 June 2017; minutes after coming on as a substitute. Three appearances followed across the 2016–17 and 2017–18 seasons, with the latter concluding with relegation to Primera B Metropolitana. During his second encounter in the third tier, Nicchiarelli scored a brace against Atlanta in November 2018. They won promotion back for 2019–20, with Nicchiarelli then leaving at the end of it.

In October 2020, Nicchiarelli completed a move to Italian football with Eccellenza Apulia outfit Atletico Racale. He left the club at the end of the season.

Career statistics
.

References

External links

1996 births
Living people
Footballers from Buenos Aires
Argentine footballers
Association football forwards
Argentine expatriate footballers
Expatriate footballers in Italy
Argentine expatriate sportspeople in Italy
Primera Nacional players
Primera B Metropolitana players
All Boys footballers